Ananias Shikongo (born 25 April 1986) is a Paralympian athlete from Namibia competing mainly in category T11 (totally blind) short-distance events. He was born in 1986 and lives in Windhoek, Namibia. He shares a shack in the Katutura township with Paralympic silver medalist and school friend Johannes Nambala.

Shikongo is Africa’s sprint champion in 100m and 200m in T11 (classification). He grew up in Okankolo Constituency, Oshikoto Region, in a village in proximity to the Angolan border. He lost his eyesight in both eyes in two separate incidents during his childhood. He went to a special School in Ongwediva and to Windhoek Technical High School.

Despite, or because of this tragedy, Ananias managed to become a great sportsman, a model athlete and the fastest African (blind) sprinter. His character and his courage allowed him to overcome and to reach incredible heights.

2016 Paralympics
Shikongo competed in the 2016 Summer Paralympics in Rio de Janeiro. He won three medals, placing third in both the T11 100m and 400m sprints and coming first in the T11 200m. He won the 200m with a Paralympic Record time of 22.44 seconds. He is the third Namibian athlete to win a medal at a Paralympic competition.

References

External links 
 Ananias Shikongo at the International Paralympic Committee
 
 Ananias Shikongo official website
 The Namibian - Spotlight on Ananias Shikongo

Paralympic athletes of Namibia
1986 births
Living people
Athletes (track and field) at the 2016 Summer Paralympics
Medalists at the 2016 Summer Paralympics
Medalists at the 2020 Summer Paralympics
Paralympic gold medalists for Namibia
Paralympic silver medalists for Namibia
Paralympic bronze medalists for Namibia
Namibian male sprinters
African Games gold medalists for Namibia
African Games medalists in athletics (track and field)
African Games bronze medalists for Namibia
Athletes (track and field) at the 2011 All-Africa Games
Athletes (track and field) at the 2015 African Games
Paralympic gold medalists in athletics (track and field)